Osakwe is a surname. Notable people with the surname include:

Ada Osakwe (born 1981), Nigerian economist, entrepreneur, and corporate executive
Amaka Osakwe (born 1987), Nigerian fashion designer
Patrick Osakwe (born 1948), Nigerian politician

Surnames of Nigerian origin